Serial Front Panel Data Port(Serial FPDP or SFPDP) is a high speed low latency data streaming serial communication protocol.  It currently supports several distinct speeds:

 1.0625 Gbit/s
 2.125 Gbit/s
 2.5 Gbit/s
 5.0 Gbit/s
 6.25 Gbit/s
 8.5 Gbit/s
 10 Gbit/s
 10.3125 Gbit/s
 25.78125 Gbit/s

Serial FPDP also recommends the use of one of the following link widths:

 x1
 x4
 x8
 x12 (5 Gbit/s and up)
 x24 (5 Gbit/s and up)
 x48 (10 Gbit/s and up)

See also
 Front Panel Data Port (aka parallel FPDP)
 VXI

References
 

Computer buses
Serial buses
Digital electronics